Pierrecourt may refer to:

Pierrecourt, Haute-Saône, a commune in the French region of Franche-Comté
Pierrecourt, Seine-Maritime, a commune in the French region of Haute-Normandie